A suborder of brachiopods containing the families:
 Superfamily Lyttonioidea
 Family Lyttoniidae
 Family Rigbyellidae
 Superfamily Permianelloidea
 Family Permianellidae

References

Strophomenata